Lycodon butleri, also known commonly as Butler's wolf snake, is a species of snake in the family Colubridae. The species is native to southern Thailand and peninsular Malaysia.

Etymology
Lycodon butleri is named after British zoologist Arthur Lennox Butler (1873–1939), the Curator of the Selangor State Museum.

Reproduction
Lycodon butleri is oviparous, or egg-laying.

Phylogeny
Lycodon butleri is a member of the genus Lycodon, a genus of snakes commonly known as wolf snakes. The genus belongs to the snake family Colubridae, the largest snake family, with member species being found on every continent except Antarctica.

Habitat and ecology

Geographic range
L. butleri has been recorded from the province of Krabi in southern Thailand, as well as from peninsular Malaysia.

Conservation status
The International Union for Conservation of Nature (IUCN) considers Lycodon butleri to be a species of "Least Concern", based on a 2011 survey. The species faces no major threats, and no population trends are known. No species-specific conservation policies exist for this snake, but its range includes several protected areas.

References

Further reading
Boulenger GA (1900). "Description of a new Snake from the Perak Hills". Journal of the Bombay Natural History Society 13: 336. (Lycodon butleri, new species).

butleri
Reptiles described in 1900
Reptiles of Thailand
Reptiles of Malaysia
Snakes of Southeast Asia